Marc Morrone (born 1960 in Bronx, New York) is an American animal dealer and breeder and host of The Pet Shop with Marc Morrone for Mag Rack.

He also hosted Petkeeping with Marc Morrone, a television program produced by Martha Stewart Living Omnimedia, which originally ended its run on September 17, 2006, although several stations throughout the country continue to air old episodes to meet their E/I requirements. It was in production again on the Hallmark Channel in 2011-2012. He currently lives with his wife and many pets.

Early life and career
At age four, Morrone adopted his first pet, a parakeet named Jinxie.  By age 18, Morrone's pet collection had outgrown his parents' house.  In 1978, Morrone opened a pet store Parrots of the World. with his business partner Nick Guerra in Rockville Centre, New York. The store has since grown into a large business and as of November 2021 it is still in operation.

Morrone's television career began as a guest on the News 12 program The Family Pet.  In 1995, he started a cable show, Extra Help Pet Show, later renamed Metro Pets. The local cable show led to Morrone's guest appearances with Martha Stewart on her television program Martha Stewart Living, starting in 1997. In 2001, Hearst Entertainment began syndication of The Pet Shop With Marc Morrone.

Petkeeping with Marc Morrone
In 2003, Martha Stewart Living Omnimedia gave him a half-hour show, Petkeeping with Marc Morrone. The program is taped on location in his pet store. Morrone was also a frequent contributor to Kids magazine, also published by Martha Stewart Living Omnimedia, and currently hosts a weekly radio program Petkeeping for Martha Stewart Living Radio, on Sirius Satellite Radio.

Pets which have appeared on Petkeeping

List of episodes

The Pet Shop with Marc Morrone
In March 2006 Morrone was featured on Mag Rack, in the Video On Demand series The Pet Shop with Marc Morrone. The program follows a similar format as Petkeeping, and aims to offer helpful and useful advice on caring for a variety of animals. It also includes appearance by his pets including Harry, a scarlet macaw; Splash, a ferret; and Harvey, a 13-pound Flemish rabbit. 25 episodes were developed for the first season, and cover various topics such as alternatives to dogs as pets, housetraining pets, caring for smaller animals, and tips on setting up and maintaining aquariums.

Thieves rob Parrots of the World
On August 15, 2007, robbers broke into Morrone's Parrots of the World store through a back window and stole 45 parrots, including cockatoos, grey parrots and a toucan. The lot was valued at over $60,000. Morrone expressed concern for the pilfered parrots because they require special food and care and could die if they become overstressed. None of the stolen birds were Morrone's pets that have appeared on  television with him, although many of them also live in the store.

Books
Morrone has authored five books, Ask The Dog Keeper, Ask The Cat Keeper, Ask The Fish Keeper and Ask the Bird Keeper, all published by Bowtie Press in 2009. A Man For All Species, a book about the adventures of an animal keeper, was published by Random House in 2010.

References

"The Wild World of Pet Retailing." Business Week Online. May 13, 2005.
"Talking to Animals, and About Them, on TV." New York Times (Late Edition (East Coast)). December 28, 2003. p. 4.
"If Only He Could Talk, Squeak or Squawk to the Animals." New York Times (Late Edition (East Coast)). January 4, 2004. p. 59.
 Breen, V. The Battle Against 'Puppy Mills'

External links 
Parrots of the World

American radio personalities
Television personalities from New York City
Living people
1960 births
People from the Bronx
People from Rockville Centre, New York